The Immaculate Conception Parish Church commonly known as Santa Cruz Church is a Roman Catholic church along Pedro Guevarra Street, Poblacion, Santa Cruz, Laguna, Philippines.

History
Santa Cruz was formerly annexed (or visita) of Lumban and became an independent parish under the advocacy of the Immaculate Conception in 1602 with Father Gabriel de Castro as priest. Due to sanitary problems in the original location, the church was transferred in 1608 in its present location and built the present church under the direction of Father Antonio de la Llave. Father Miguel Perciva added a  transept under his direction in 1672. The church was later renovated by building a nave, convent and remodeling of the five altars by Father Juan Marzon in 1850. The church was destroyed by fire on January 28, 1945 during the Liberation. It was reconstructed in 1948 under Father Mariano Limjuco.

Besides the devotion to the Virgin Mary, an image of the Holy Guardian Angel, whose devotion started in 1678 by Fernando de la Concepcion, was venerated in Santa Cruz. After being housed at Pila, the infirmary of the Franciscan religious was transferred to Pila on July 13, 1674.

Notes

Bibliography

External links 
 
 Immaculate Conception Parish - Santa Cruz, Laguna (Official Facebook page)

Santa Cruz, Laguna
Santa Cruz, Laguna
Santa Cruz, Laguna
Churches in the Roman Catholic Diocese of San Pablo